Alasdair Beckett-King (born 31 May 1984) is an English stand-up comedian, video game writer, and actor from Durham. He won the 2017 Leicester Mercury Comedian of the Year.

Early life
Beckett-King attended York St John University and graduated in 2012.

Career
Alasdair Beckett-King was listed among the finalists of So You Think You're Funny in 2013. He was also among the finalists of NATYS: New Acts of the Year Show in 2014.

Beckett-King won the 2017 Leicester Mercury Comedian of the Year.

Beckett-King has appeared on The Comedian's Comedian with Stuart Goldsmith and Unforeseen Incidents. He co-hosts the Loremen podcast with James Shakeshaft.

Beckett-King wrote the script for adventure game Unforeseen Incidents, released in 2018.

In 2022, Beckett-King voiced the character of "The Floater" in Doctor Who: Redacted, produced by BBC Studios.

Alasdair was also an occasional panellist on Mock the Week, a popular British comic news quiz show, most notably appearing in the show's final ever episode.

References

External links

English male comedians
Living people
1984 births
Alumni of York St John University
21st-century English comedians